The 2017–18 Wofford Terriers men's basketball team represented Wofford College during the 2017–18 NCAA Division I men's basketball season. The Terriers, led by 16th-year head coach Mike Young, played their home games at the newly opened Jerry Richardson Indoor Stadium in Spartanburg, South Carolina as members of the Southern Conference. They finished the season 21–13, 11–7 in SoCon play to finish in a tie for fourth place. They defeated Mercer in the quarterfinals of the SoCon tournament to advance to the semifinals where they lost to UNC Greensboro. They were invited to the CollegeInsider.com Tournament where, after a first round bye, they lost in the second round to Central Michigan.

Previous season
The Terriers finished the 2016–17 season 16–17, 10–8 in SoCon play to finish in a tie for fourth place. They defeated Chattanooga in the quarterfinals of the SoCon tournament to advance to the semifinals where they lost to UNC Greensboro.

Roster

Schedule and results

|-
!colspan=9 style=| Regular season

 

|-
!colspan=9 style=| SoCon tournament

|-
!colspan=9 style=| CIT

References 

Wofford Terriers men's basketball seasons
Wofford
Wolf
Wolf
Wofford